The 1981 Sam Houston State Bearkats football team represented Sam Houston State University as a member of the Lone Star Conference (LSC) during the 1981 NCAA Division II football season. Led by fourth-year head coach Melvin Brown, the Bearkats compiled an overall record of 2–8 with a mark of 2–5 in conference play, and finished sixth in the LSC.

Schedule

References

Sam Houston State
Sam Houston Bearkats football seasons
Sam Houston State Bearkats football